RFA Spapool (A222) was a Spa-class coastal water carrier of the Royal Fleet Auxiliary.

The ship was laid down on 13 August 1945 by Charles Hill & Sons of Bristol, launched on 28 February 1946, and was commissioned on 14 June 1946, serving until 1976 when it was sold off by the Ministry of Defence.

Spapool was purchased commercially in July 1976 at Mombasa and used by Divecon Ltd. as a salvage vessel later that year for the recovery of MV Southern Pioneer, a tanker that sank at Tanga, Tanzania. She was used as a bunker barge in Mombasa after the boiler was condemned. The ship sank on Christmas Day 1983, and was salvaged by Divecon Ltd., Mombasa in 1984, and scrapped.

References

Spa-class coastal water carriers
1946 ships